Dame Jennifer Margaret Harries  is a British public health physician who has been the chief executive of the UK Health Security Agency and head of NHS Test and Trace since April 2021. She was previously a regional director at Public Health England, and then Deputy Chief Medical Officer for England from June 2019 to April 2021.

Early life and education
Born in Monmouth, Harries studied medicine at the University of Birmingham gaining an intercalated BSc in pharmacology in 1981 and medical degrees, MB ChB, in 1984.

Career
Harries was Regional Director for the South of England for Public Health England from February 2013 before being appointed Deputy Chief Medical officer for England in June 2019. The appointment of a new Chief Medical Officer for England, Chris Whitty was announced simultaneously.

Effective 1 April 2021, Harries was appointed as the first chief executive of the new UK Health Security Agency, which combines Public Health England and England's NHS Test and Trace.

She was appointed Officer of the Order of the British Empire (OBE) in the 2016 New Year Honours and Dame Commander of the Order of the British Empire (DBE) in the 2022 New Year Honours for services to health.

Role in the UK government response to the COVID-19 pandemic
Harries appeared at some of the daily press conferences held by the UK government to provide updates about the COVID-19 pandemic. She contributed medical information and answered questions from the press, however some of her statements, including suggesting that those receiving fake virus-tracing phone calls could identify them from the tone of the conversation, or that the UK had a "perfectly adequate supply of PPE", met with controversy and calls by scientists such as Professor Anthony Costello, director of University College London's Institute for Global Health, for her to resign.

In early March 2020, Harries stated "the virus will not survive very long outside," and "many outdoor events, particularly, are relatively safe," and warned that it was "not a good idea" for members of the public to wear a mask in which the virus could get trapped, thus increasing the risk of infection. Cheltenham Festival, a four-day event started weeks later and attended by about 150,000 people, was referred to in the following month by Sir David King, the government's chief scientific adviser from 2000 to 2007, as "the best possible way to accelerate the spread of the virus".

Harries suggested in March 2020 that the World Health Organization (WHO)'s advice to "test, test, test" people for COVID-19 and trace their contacts was primarily intended for countries that were less well developed than the UK, arguing that "there comes a point in a pandemic where that is not an appropriate intervention": "The clue for WHO is in its title. It is a World Health Organisation and it is addressing all countries across the world with entirely different health infrastructures and particularly public health infrastructures. We have an extremely well-developed public health system in this country and in fact our public health teams actually train others abroad. So the point there is that they are addressing every country, including low- and middle-income countries, so encouraging all countries to test of some type," Harries said; other highly developed countries remained committed to extensive testing and experienced fewer deaths.

Harries also suggested that the risk of flu or road accident was higher than that posed by COVID-19 for schoolchildren.

In December 2021, The Telegraph reported that it was understood that Harries was the source of a contested figure that there was an average 17-day delay between infection and hospitalisation for COVID-19, used by Health Secretary Sajid Javid. Former Treasury statistician Simon Briscoe was quoted as saying that the figure seemed like either a "deliberate statistical sleight of hand designed to deceive, or incompetence" and that if deliberate, officials were "in effect trying to buy time, as officials realise that data of rising hospitalisations is needed to justify lockdown".

References

Civil servants in the Ministry of Health (United Kingdom)
Date of birth missing (living people)
Living people
British women medical doctors
People educated at Haberdashers' Monmouth School for Girls
Alumni of the University of Birmingham
Date of birth unknown
Year of birth missing (living people)
Dames Commander of the Order of the British Empire